Imelda "Melita" Ramírez (29 November 1930 – 13 August 2016) was a Mexican tennis player.

Ramírez, the 1948 Orange Bowl champion, was active on the international tour during the 1950s. She was regarded as Mexico's best women's player until the emergence of her younger sister Yolanda "Yola" Ramírez, who twice won the French Championships in doubles.

Her achievements include winning a gold medal for mixed doubles at the 1951 Pan American Games and a further four gold medals for Mexico at the Central American and Caribbean Games. In 1952 and 1953 she claimed back to back titles at the Canadian Championships. She was the first Mexican to compete in a ladies draw at Wimbledon and reached the women's doubles quarterfinals of the 1954 French Championships.

References

External links
 

1930 births
2016 deaths
Mexican female tennis players
Pan American Games medalists in tennis
Pan American Games gold medalists for Mexico
Pan American Games silver medalists for Mexico
Pan American Games bronze medalists for Mexico
Tennis players at the 1951 Pan American Games
Tennis players at the 1959 Pan American Games
Central American and Caribbean Games medalists in tennis
Central American and Caribbean Games gold medalists for Mexico
Central American and Caribbean Games silver medalists for Mexico
Competitors at the 1950 Central American and Caribbean Games
Competitors at the 1954 Central American and Caribbean Games
Competitors at the 1959 Central American and Caribbean Games
Medalists at the 1951 Pan American Games
20th-century Mexican women